Tonita is a feminine given name and a surname. Notable people with this name include the following:

Given name
Tonita Castro (1953 – 2016), Mexican-born American actress
Tonita Peña born as Quah Ah and also known as Tonita Vigil Peña and María Antonia Tonita Peña (1893 – 1949), American artist

Surname
Ovidiu Toniţa (born 1980), Romanian rugby union player

See also

Tobita (disambiguation)
Tonia (name)
Tonina (disambiguation)
Tonite (disambiguation)
Toñito (name)